The Lusail Tram, formerly Lusail LRT, is a light rail network in the Lusail urban development project north of Doha, the capital of Qatar. The first phase of the system, a six-station stretch of the Orange Line, opened to the public with "preview service" on 1 January 2022. More stations will be gradually opened to the public, starting with Lusail Central station from 9 April 2022.

The Lusail Tram will be operated and maintained for a duration of 20 years by RKH Qitarat, a joint venture formed by Hamad Group (51%) and French transit operators Keolis and RATP Dev (49%), on behalf of system owner Qatar Rail. It uses a fleet of 35 Alstom Citadis trams.

Lines

Purple Line
The Purple Line will have the following stations:
Lusail is connected with Lusail metro station 
Grand Masjed
Boulevard 
Crescent Junction is connected with Turquoise Line, Orange Line
Lusail Towers is connected with Pink Line.

Pink Line
The Pink Line will have the following stations:
Leqtaifya is connected with Leqtaifiya metro station ,
Marina is connected with Orange Line
Marina Mall is connected with Orange Line
Yacht Club is connected with Orange Line
Esplande is connected with Orange Line
Lusail Central is connected with Orange Line
Entertainment City
Broadwalk
Al Seef 
Lusail Towers is connected with  Orange Line
Seef Promenade

Orange Line
The Orange Line shares tracks with the Pink Line between Legtaifiya and Lusail Central before branching west.  At Al-Wadi, it begins a unidirectional, counterclockwise loop, sharing tracks with the Turquoise Line, before returning to Al-Wadi and back to Legtaifiya.  It has the following stations:

Under construction
Al Wadi
South Fox Hills is connected with Turquoise Line
Cresecent Junction is connected with Turquoise Line and Purple Line
North Fox Hills is connected with Turquoise Line
Downtown is connected with Turquoise Line
Fox Hills Park is connected with  Turquoise Line
Al Manazel is connected with Turquoise Line
Al Erkyah is connected with Turquoise Line
2022 is connected with Turquoise Line
Energy City North is connected with Turquoise Line

Turquoise Line 
The Turquoise Line will have the following stations:
Al Manazel is connected with Orange Line
Al Erkyah is connected with Orange Line
2022 is connected with Orange Line
Energy City North is connected with Orange Line
South Fox Hills is connected with Orange Line
Cresecent Junction is connected with Orange Line, Purple Line
North Fox Hills is connected with Orange Line
Downtown is connected with Orange Line
Fox Hills Park is connected with  Orange Line
Al Manazel is connected with Orange Line

References

Keolis
Lusail
Rail transport in Qatar
Railway lines opened in 2022
RATP Group
Tram and light rail transit systems under construction
2022 establishments in Qatar